Robert Ruffin Barrow (1798 – 1875) was one of the largest landowners and slave owner in the south before the American Civil War. He owned sixteen plantations, mostly in Louisiana, and had large landholdings in Texas. He also invested money in projects in which he saw potential. The most well known investment he made was in the early submarine projects of his brother-in-law, Horace Hunley, for the Confederate States Navy.

Early life
Barrow was born in 1798 in North Carolina. His father owned Afton Villa.

Career
Barrow was one of the largest landowners in Terrebonne Parish, Louisiana, where he owned six plantations: Residence, Caillou Grove, Honduras, Myrtle Grove, Crescent Farm, and Point Farm.
Residence Plantation took its name from the fact that Barrow regarded it as his home. Its main house Residence Plantation House is currently on the National Register of Historical Places.  He also owned the Donaldsonville Plantation in Ascension Parish, the Locust Grove Plantation in Assumption Parish, the Oak Grove Plantation in Lafourche Parish, and several plantations in Texas. He became "one of the wealthiest planters" in Louisiana, and the owner of hundreds of slaves.

During the American Civil War of 1861–1865, Barrow financed the construction of submarines for the Confederate States Navy. He lost much of his wealth as a result of the war, however much was regained back to his family and descendants.

Barrow was politically active in Louisiana.

Personal life, death and legacy
Barrow married Volumnia Washington Hunley, the sister of Confederate Navy officer Horace Lawson Hunley, in 1850. They had a son, Robert Ruffin Jr., and a daughter, Volumnia Roberta.

Barrow died in 1875. His daughter Roberta, who inherited his Residence Plantation in Terrebone Parish, built the Residence Plantation House, now listed on the National Register of Historic Places.

Philanthropy
The best known investment R. R. Barrow made was for the construction of the Hunley submarines. Less known are the donation of land and money he made to many people.

Records show that he donated land ~60 feet x ~117 feet that were valued at $300 each to widows of friends and workers, both white and black. The donations took place in the years 1854–1873.  His largest donation to a private individual named John B. Pittman was half of the property of Oak Grove Plantation in Lafourche Parish.

There are  donations to various churches of various Christian faiths. 
He donated five lots to  St. Matthews Episcopal Church on Barrow Street in Houma, Louisiana, valued at $1000 at that time on June 7, 1857. 
On September 1, 1857 he donated four lots on the corner of  School Street and Goode Street in Houma worth $8000 to the Church of Presbyterian Congregation.

In  1856  R.R. Barrow gave the land and material for the  Little Zion Baptist Church in Houma, which was the first black church in Terrebonne Parish, and enticed (by giving him a house to live in) a black free man of color (Rev. Isaiah Lawson) to come and be the pastor of the church and to educate the black children. The church was built by slaves and free men of color  using cypress wood cut at R.R. Barrow's saw mill at Residence Plantation.

On April 1, 1873  R.R. Barrow officially donated one arpen  to  the Church. The  church has been remodeled several times and after remodeling the name was changed to New Zion Baptist Church. The church and graveyard can be visited today at 263 Grand Caillou Rd. in Houma Louisiana. Across Grand Caillou Road from New Zion Baptist Church is the church cemetery, which has over 700 tombs. Some graves date all the way back to the early 1800s.

On June 14, 1847,  R.R. Barrow gave a tract of land at the end of Church Street to Bishop Antoine Blanc of New Orleans for the specific purpose of building a Catholic church in Houma. At the time, St. Francis de Sales Parish covered the whole civil parish of Terrebonne and a part of St. Mary Parish east of the Atchafalaya.

Rev. Z. Leveque was appointed the first pastor. He found about 200 Catholic families scattered throughout the parish, living mainly along the four principal bayous (Terrebonne, Petite Caillou, Grand Caillou and Black). He faced two major challenges: teaching the families the elementary doctrines of the Catholic faith, and the building of a church structure. He left the following year, before the church structure was complete; it was not complete until 1854. He did, however, leave a written report for his successor.

After the abolishment of slavery R.R. Barrow gave to his workers the land and houses that the workers had lived on his plantations.

See also
Alexander Barrow

References

External links
 Volumnia Farm website

1798 births
1875 deaths
People from North Carolina
People from Terrebonne Parish, Louisiana
American planters
American slave owners